The 1978 season in Swedish football, starting April 1978 and ending November 1978:

Honours

Official titles

Notes

References 
Online

 
Seasons in Swedish football